The 1934–35 Montreal Maroons season was the 11th season of the NHL franchise. The team finished second in the Canadian Division. In the playoffs, the Maroons defeated Chicago Black Hawks, the New York Rangers and the Toronto Maple Leafs to win the franchise's second Stanley Cup championship.

Offseason
Tommy Gorman, after winning the Stanley Cup with the Chicago Black Hawks, was hired to coach the Maroons, replacing Eddie Gerard.

Regular season

Final standings

Record vs. opponents

Playoffs

The Maroons went against Chicago and won 1 goal to 0, or 1–0.  Baldy Northcott scored the only goal of the 2-game total goals series, at 4:02 of overtime in game 2 at Chicago.  They went against the  New York Rangers in the second round and won 2-game total goals series 5 goals to 4, or 5–4.

Stanley Cup Final

They went against Toronto in the Final in a best-of-five series and swept them in three games, or 3–0.
Tommy Gorman became the first man in NHL history to coach back to back Stanley Cup Champions for 2 different teams.

Schedule and results

Finals
Montreal Maroons vs. Toronto Maple Leafs

Montreal wins best-of-five series 3–0.

Player stats

Regular season
Scoring

Goaltending

Playoffs
Scoring

Goaltending

Note: GP = Games played; G = Goals; A = Assists; Pts = Points; +/- = Plus/minus; PIM = Penalty minutes; PPG = Power-play goals; SHG = Short-handed goals; GWG = Game-winning goals
      MIN=Minutes played; W = Wins; L = Losses; T = Ties; GA = Goals against; GAA = Goals against average; SO = Shutouts;

Transactions

Trades

References
Maroons on Hockey Database

Stanley Cup championship seasons
Montreal Maroons seasons
Montreal Maroons
Montreal Maroons